An oxaphosphetane is a molecule containing a four-membered ring with one phosphorus, one oxygen and two carbon atoms. In a 1,2-oxaphosphetane phosphorus is bonded directly to oxygen, whereas a 1,3-oxaphosphetane has the phosphorus and oxygen atoms at opposite corners.

1,2-Oxaphosphetanes are rarely isolated but are important intermediates in the Wittig reaction and related reactions such as the Seyferth–Gilbert homologation and the Horner–Wadsworth–Emmons reaction. Edwin Vedejs's NMR studies first revealed the importance of oxaphosphetanes in the mechanism of the Wittig reaction in the 1970s.

References 

Phosphorus heterocycles
Oxygen heterocycles
Four-membered rings